Chasing Rainbows (also known as The Road Show) is a 1930 American Pre-Code romantic musical film directed by Charles Reisner, and released by Metro-Goldwyn-Mayer.

The film reunites The Broadway Melody stars Bessie Love and Charles King, with a supporting cast of Jack Benny, Marie Dressler, and Polly Moran. This was Jack Benny's first dramatic role in a motion picture.

Filmed in July and August 1929, it was not released for months later, missing an opportunity to capitalize on the success of its song "Happy Days Are Here Again", which by then had already been a major hit.

Plot 
Carlie (Love) and Terry (King) are in a traveling vaudeville troupe with Eddie (Benny), the stage manager; Bonnie (Dressler), a comedian; and Polly (Moran), the wardrobe mistress. Terry constantly falls in love with his leading ladies, and marries Daphne (Martan), a two-timing songstress. When he finds her with another man, Terry threatens to kill himself, but Carlie reassures him that "Happy Days Are Here Again," and the show goes on.

Cast

Reception 
The film was commercially successful, but not as much as expected.

Love, Dressler, and Benny all received positive reviews for their performances.

Preservation status 
Chasing Rainbows was mostly filmed in black and white, but had two Technicolor sequences. The film survives, but those sequences are lost, having been removed for a 1931 re-release and destroyed in the 1965 MGM vault fire. Sound from the lost color sequences still exists on Vitaphone disks, including "Happy Days Are Here Again".

The film has been issued on DVD in the Warner Archive Collection.

See also 
 List of American films of 1930
 List of early color feature films

References

External links 
 
 
 
 
 Surviving Vitaphone soundtrack for lost reels 10 & 11 at SoundCloud

1930 films
1930s musical comedy-drama films
1930s romantic comedy-drama films
1930s color films
American black-and-white films
American romantic comedy-drama films
American musical comedy-drama films
American romantic musical films
Films directed by Charles Reisner
Metro-Goldwyn-Mayer films
1930s romantic musical films
1930 comedy films
1930 drama films
1930s English-language films
1930s American films